Mircea Veroiu (29 April 1941 – 26 December 1997) was a Romanian film director and screenwriter. He directed 22 films between 1968 and 1997. He was a member of the jury at the 41st Berlin International Film Festival.

Selected filmography
 Nunta de piatră (1972) – director
 The Actor and the Savages (1975)  —  actor
 Armed and Dangerous (1977) —  actor
 The Prophet, the Gold and the Transylvanians (1978) — director
 The Actress, the Dollars and the Transylvanians (1979) — director

References

External links

1941 births
1997 deaths
Romanian film directors
Romanian screenwriters
Romanian male film actors
20th-century Romanian male actors
20th-century screenwriters